Scalpelling is a body art procedure similar to body piercing for the creation of decorative perforations through the skin and other body tissue, and is most commonly used as a replacement for or enhancement of ear piercing. Whereas piercing is typically performed with a hollow piercing needle or an ear piercing instrument, scalpelling is performed by using a scalpel to cut a slit into the skin. Unlike dermal punching, no flesh is removed. The technique can immediately produce holes with a larger diameter than can be achieved by piercing. This is a more rapid means of accommodating larger gauge jewellery than stretching, a technique whereby piercings are enlarged by inserting gradually larger jewellery. Scalpelling is performed to quickly achieve a large-gauge piercing, when scar tissue is preventing further stretching, if tissue has thinned to the point where further stretching could cause it to break, or to combine two closely placed piercings into one hole. 

Though the wounds associated with scalpelling are large, the extremely sharp nature of the scalpel leads to a wound which is more likely to heal cleanly and without complications. Further, the use of scalpelling rather than stretching allows for greater control over which parts of the flesh will be used and can act to correct piercings that are unbalanced or poorly located.

Scalpelling is a fairly new body modification technique, and is still quite rare. It is most commonly performed on earlobes, but can also be used for such modifications as labrets.

Scalpelling should not be confused with a form of scarification, whereby images are inscribed in a person's skin using a scalpel.

Risks
Because of the skill required by scalpelling and the danger associated with additional blood loss, scalpelling by piercers is not legal in some jurisdictions. 

One potentially negative effect of scalpelling is that the holes created by the process are less likely to close naturally over time than those from stretched piercings. Though it is still possible in some cases, especially at smaller sizes, it is far more likely that an unwanted hole would have to be closed surgically.

References

Body piercing
Body modification
Body art